The Angrapa is a river that begins in northeastern Poland and ends in the Kaliningrad Oblast of Russia. Originating in Lake Mamry, it joins the 101-km-long Instruch at a point near Chernyakhovsk  – variously assessed as lying 140, 169, or 172 km from its source – to form the Pregolya. Its largest tributaries are the 89-km-long Gołdapa, which joins just before the border, and the Pissa (98 km).

The name Angrapa is derived from the Old Prussian words anguris (eel) and apis (river). The towns of Węgorzewo, Ozyorsk and Chernyakhovsk as well as the village of Mayakovskoye, are situated along the course of the Angrapa.

References

See also
 Rivers of Poland
 Rivers of Russia
 List of rivers of Europe

Rivers of Warmian-Masurian Voivodeship
Rivers of Kaliningrad Oblast
International rivers of Europe
Rivers of Poland